Energy use in Rwanda is undergoing rapid change at the beginning of the 21st century.

Electricity

Network
The extent of grid electricity is limited and mainly concentrated near Kigali. Most of the country uses firewood as its main energy source. 
Rwanda is planning to expand from 276 MW of grid power in 2022 to 556 MW in 2024 and may import some additional electricity from neighboring countries. In addition, it is installing small solar units throughout the country to ensure that households located in off-grid areas have access to electricity, or to help deal with power outages. Currently, the government plans to bring electricity access to 100% of the population by 2024, as opposed to 74.5% in 2022.

Generation
With its limited electrical infrastructure, Rwanda has a very high degree of renewable energy usage. Most of the country's electricity comes from hydropower. 
Electrical production accounted for 4% of energy use in the country in 2014,

Hydroelectricity
53% of electricity is generated by hydropower. At the end of 2018, Rwanda's grid-connected power plants supplied 221.1MW.

Gas fired generation
KivuWatt project is an energy project to extract natural gas dissolved in Lake Kivu and use the extracted gas to generate electricity. In 2016, the operational 25 MW power plant is able to provide enough energy for 45,000 people in Rwanda. The ongoing expansion project is expected to add 26 MW of generating capacity in its first phase, and eventually scale up to 100 MW in the coming years.

Utility scale solar
The first utility-scale solar farm in Sub-Saharan Africa outside of South Africa is the 8.5 MW plant at Agahozo-Shalom Youth Village, in the Rwamagana District, Eastern Province of Rwanda. It leased  of land from the village which is a charity to house and educate Rwandan genocide victims. The plant uses  28,360 photovoltaic panels and produces 6% of total electrical supply of the country. The project was built with U.S., Israeli, Dutch, Norwegian, Finnish and UK funding and expertise.

Micro scale solar
The use of off-grid solar power has increased as solar panel prices have fallen and many areas do not expect grid connections in the near future. 
Solar power produces over 2% of electricity in the country. The country is in the midst of a rapid expansion of its electrical grid and many new plants are proposed or under construction.

Biomass 
Biomass is the most important energy source utilized through firewood and agricultural waste for cooking. In 2014, this represented 85% of Rwanda's energy use. Peat from peat marshes in southwestern Rwanda will power two electrical plants. The first 15 MW plant is expected online in 2015 with the second, a 80 MW plant, expected in 2017.

Other energy sources 
Petroleum, mainly for transportation, represented 11% of Rwanda's power in 2014. Although Rwanda is thought to have crude oil and natural gas reserves near Lake Kivu, as of 2014, there was no production of these resources and demand was met by imports.  The Kenya–Uganda–Rwanda Petroleum Products Pipeline would transport oil between these countries if it is built.

See also
List of power stations in Rwanda
EARP Rwanda

References